Donavon Francis Smith (October 2, 1922 – 	September 10, 1974) was a United States Army Air Forces flying ace during the World War II. He accrued 5.5 victories in the war.

He retired from the United States Air Force in 1973 at the rank of lieutenant general.

Early life
Smith was born on October 2, 1922, in Dowagiac, Michigan. He graduated from Niles High School in Niles, Michigan, in 1940.

World War II

He entered the aviation cadet program in January 1942 and commenced his Primary training at Bruce Field, Texas on 30 March 1942, and soloed the Fairchild PT-19 after seven hours and 16 minutes of instruction. He later moved to Randolph Field, Texas for Basic training and Advanced training at Foster Field, Texas. Smith was commissioned as a second lieutenant in the U.S. Army Air Corps and was awarded his pilot wings on October 9, 1942.

After completing P-47 Thunderbolt training, Smith joined the 61st Fighter Squadron of the 56th Fighter Group at Bridgeport, Connecticut, in November 1942. He was deployed with the group to England in January 1943. Arriving at RAF Kings Cliffe in January 1943, he flew his first mission from RAF Horsham St. Faith on May 4, 1943. In July 1943, the group moved to RAF Halesworth.

On July 30, 1943, while escorting B-17 Flying Fortresses over Emden, Germany, Smith was credited with a probable destruction of a Messerschmitt Bf 109. His biggest day came on December 11, during a bomber escort mission against military objectives in the heavily defended area of Emden, Germany. During the mission, his flight was attacked by Messerschmitt Bf 110s. Engaging five of them, he managed to shoot down two Bf 110s. In the same mission, he was credited with a shared destruction of a Focke-Wulf Fw 190 and damaged one Bf 110. 
For his heroism in the mission, Smith received the Distinguished Service Cross.

Smith continued to score aerial victories. He shot down two Bf 110s over Steinhude Lake on February 20, 1944. He finally became a flying ace, when he shot down a Fw 190 over Lippstadt on February 22.

In April 1944, Smith finished his operational tour, opting to take 30 days of shore leave and returning to the 56th Fighter Group for a second tour in July 1944. During this time, the 56th FG was equipped with the new "Bubbletop" P-47s and was stationed at RAF Boxted. He was appointed as commander of the 61st Fighter Squadron in September 1944. He flew his 124th and final combat mission with the 56th FG on January 5, 1945.

During World War II, Smith was credited with the destruction of 5.5 enemy aircraft in aerial combat plus 1 probable, 2 damaged, and 2 destroyed on the ground while strafing enemy airfields. While serving with the 56th FG, he flew P-47s bearing the names "P J & Hun Hunter", "Ole Cock II" and "Ole Cock III".

United States Air Force career
Smith returned to the United States in March 1945 and was assigned as project officer, Tactics Division, Army Air Forces Board, at Orlando Army Air Field, Florida. In November 1945 he was transferred to Headquarters Army Air Forces, Washington, D.C., as air staff officer, Intelligence. In May 1946 he was assigned to Strategic Air Command at Selfridge Field, Michigan, where he rejoined the 56th Fighter Group as commander of the 61st Fighter Squadron. He next was operations officer for the 56th Fighter Group and then chief of supply, 56th Fighter Wing. In 1948 he participated as operations officer in the first overseas deployment of jet fighter aircraft, from Selfridge Air Force Base to West Germany and return.

General Smith was U.S. Air Force/Royal Air Force exchange officer, from August 1949 to September 1950 and served as commander, No. 1 Squadron RAF, at Tangmere, England. From October 1950 to July 1956, he served with Air Defense Command in various assignments including inspector general, 56th Fighter Interceptor Group, Selfridge Air Force Base; commander, 63d Fighter Interceptor Squadron, Wurtsmith Air Force Base, Michigan; commander, 518th Air Defense Group, Niagara Falls Air Force Base, New York; and director of military personnel, Headquarters Air Defense Command, Ent Air Force Base, Colorado.

In July 1956, Smith returned to Europe and became commander of the 21st Fighter Bomber Group at Chambley-Bussières Air Base, France. In December 1957 he was assigned to Supreme Headquarters Allied Powers Europe, Paris, France, as chief of the Atomic Operations Section, Air Atomic Operations Division (Joint Staff).

Smith returned to the United States in July 1960 and was reassigned to Air Defense Command at McChord Air Force Base, Washington, as director, North American Air Defense Command Operations, Headquarters 25th NORAD Region, and later as commander, 325th Fighter Interceptor Wing. In August 1962 he entered the National War College at Fort McNair, Washington, D.C., and graduated in June 1963.

He next was assigned to Headquarters U.S. Air Force as chief of the Air Defense Division, Directorate of Operational Requirements, Deputy Chief of Staff for Programs and Requirements. From February to May 1966, he attended the Advanced Management School at Harvard University, and then returned to Headquarters U.S. Air Force as deputy director of strategic and defense forces in the Directorate of Operational Requirements and Development Plans.

In October 1966, Smith was named chief, Air Force Advisory Group, Military Assistance Command, Vietnam. He served the next 18 months as chief adviser to the Republic of Vietnam Air Force. In May 1968 he returned to the United States and became vice commander, Ninth Air Force, Shaw Air Force Base, South Carolina. He assumed duties as commander of the Nineteenth Air Force at Seymour Johnson Air Force Base, North Carolina, in August 1969.

Smith returned to Headquarters U.S. Air Force in February 1970 and assumed duties as director of operational requirements and development plans, and in April 1971 became assistant deputy chief of staff, Plans and Operations.

In August 1972 General Smith was appointed commander, Alaskan Air Command, with additional duties as vice commander, Alaskan North American Air Defense Command and Continental Air Defense Command Region, with headquarters at Elmendorf Air Force Base, Alaska.

His final assignment was as commander of Sixth Allied Tactical Air Force at Izmir, Turkey, from June 1973 until his retirement from the Air Force on November 1, 1973.

Smith died of brain cancer on September 10, 1974, at the age of 51, and was buried with full military honors at the United States Air Force Academy Cemetery in Colorado Springs, Colorado.

In honor of him, the city of Niles, Michigan renamed its Veterans' Memorial Park to Donavon Smith Memorial Park in 1980. In 2012, he was posthumously enshrined at the Michigan Aviation Hall of Fame.

Aerial victory credits

SOURCES: Air Force Historical Study 85: USAF Credits for the Destruction of Enemy Aircraft, World War II

Awards and decorations
During his lengthy career, Smith earned many decorations, including:

Distinguished Service Cross citation

Smith, Donavon F.
First Lieutenant (Air Corps), U.S. Army Air Forces
61st Fighter Squadron, 56th Fighter Group, 8th Air Force
Date of Action:  December 11, 1943

Citation:

The President of the United States of America, authorized by Act of Congress July 9, 1918, takes pleasure in presenting the Distinguished Service Cross to First Lieutenant (Air Corps) Donavon Francis Smith, United States Army Air Forces, for extraordinary heroism in connection with military operations against an armed enemy while serving as Pilot of a P-47 Fighter Airplane in the 61st Fighter Squadron, 56th Fighter Group, EIGHTH Air Force, in aerial combat against enemy forces on a bomber escort mission against military objectives in the heavily defended area of Emden, Germany, on 11 December 1943. Near the target the bombers were attacked by a large force of rocket-firing enemy fighters. Disregarding the enemy's superiority in numbers and fire power and the danger from attack by fighters known to be flying above the rocket-carrying aircraft, Lieutenant Smith's flight attacked and became engaged with five ME-110 type fighters. Lieutenant Smith himself destroyed one enemy plane and damaged another. In the heat of battle Lieutenant Smith became separated from his flights and while trying to rejoin he observed an ME-110 airplane below and made a diving attack. He was immediately attacked by a FW-190 fighter from above, and without regard to his personal safety, Lieutenant Smith continued his attacks and destroyed the enemy plane. He then maneuvered into position for a head-on attack against his pursuer. Holding a collision course and firing accurately, Lieutenant Smith closed to such a short range that his enemy, fearing collision, bailed out, leaving his airplane to crash. Through his heroism and exceptional flying skill on this occasion, Lieutenant Smith rendered distinguished and valorous service to our nation. His unquestionable valor in aerial combat is in keeping with the highest traditions of the military service and reflects great credit upon himself, the 8th Air Force, and the United States Army Air Forces.

References

1922 births
1974 deaths
United States Army Air Forces pilots of World War II
United States Air Force personnel of the Vietnam War
American World War II flying aces
Aviators from Michigan
National War College alumni
Military personnel from Michigan
People from Dowagiac, Michigan
Recipients of the Distinguished Service Cross (United States)
Recipients of the Air Force Distinguished Service Medal
Recipients of the Legion of Merit
Recipients of the Distinguished Flying Cross (United States)
Recipients of the Air Medal
Recipients of the National Order of Vietnam
Recipients of the Distinguished Service Order (Vietnam)
Recipients of the Gallantry Cross (Vietnam)
United States Air Force generals
United States Army Air Forces officers
Deaths from brain cancer in the United States
Deaths from cancer in Texas